William John Bonness (December 15, 1923 – December 3, 1977), nicknamed "Lefty", was a Major League Baseball pitcher who played for one season. He played for the Cleveland Indians from September 26, 1944, to September 29, 1944.

External links

1923 births
1977 deaths
Cleveland Indians players
Major League Baseball pitchers
Baseball players from Cleveland